Muin may refer to:

People
 , Filipino diplomat
 Muin Bek Hafeez (born 1996), Indian basketball player
 Muin Bseiso
 Muin J. Khoury, American geneticist and epidemiologist

Other
 Muin (letter) (ᚋ), eleventh letter of the Ogham alphabet
 Muin or Mu (lost continent)

See also
 Mu'in (disambiguation)